Homosexuality: A Philosophical Inquiry is a 1988 book by the philosopher Michael Ruse, in which the author discusses different theories of homosexuality, evaluates the moral status of homosexual behavior, and argues in favor of gay rights.

The book received both positive and negative reviews. Some reviewers praised it for Ruse's comprehensive treatment of his subject, careful discussion of theories about homosexuality, and use of philosophy to support gay rights. However, Ruse's treatment of psychoanalysis, sociobiology, and social constructionism, and his use of historical evidence to discuss homosexuality in past societies, were criticized. Commentators noted that some of Ruse's comments about homosexuality could be considered insensitive, and also suggested that Ruse's arguments and conclusions about the subject were influenced by his personal reaction to the AIDS epidemic.

Summary
Ruse engages in philosophical analysis of homosexuality in order to "uncover the foundational suppositions which lead people to such different conclusions" about the subject, arguing that the spread of AIDS makes rethinking sexuality in general and homosexuality in particular an urgent task. He defines a homosexual as a "person whose erotic yearnings and fantasies are directed toward his/her own sex and whose activities are influenced by such yearnings and fantasies". Ruse defends attempts to explain homosexuality against the objection that they might harm gay people, arguing that while they could have harmful consequences they also have the potential to do good. He also discusses bisexuality. He rejects social constructionist views of sexual orientation, and defends the value of hormonal studies, summarizing the research and arguing that the studies have no necessary bias against homosexuality. Ruse discusses sociobiological theories, concluding that despite objections to them, they are scientific and potentially helpful in understanding homosexuality. Authors whose work he reviews include the classicist Kenneth Dover and the historian John Boswell.

Ruse defends Sigmund Freud, the founder of psychoanalysis, against the charge that his theories are untestable. He finds the philosopher Adolf Grünbaum's arguments, made in The Foundations of Psychoanalysis (1984), against the philosopher Karl Popper's view that psychoanalytic theories are pseudo-scientific because they can never be falsified to be decisive. He is also unconvinced by the philosopher Roger Scruton's criticism of Freud in Sexual Desire (1986). Whereas Scruton argues that genuine science does not involve metaphor, Ruse finds that "metaphor runs rampant through science from physics to sociology".

Discussing ethical issues, Ruse distinguishes between involuntary inclination and willful behavior, arguing that while a homosexual orientation is morally blameless, this is not necessarily true of homosexual behavior. He criticizes ethical arguments that appeal to scientific claims about the naturalness or unnaturalness of homosexuality, for example the views of the Greek philosopher Plato, according to whom homosexual behavior did not occur in animals. Ruse finds this claim to be mistaken.

Publication history
Homosexuality: A Philosophical Inquiry was first published in hardcover 1988 by Basil Blackwell. The book was republished in paperback in 1990.

Reception
Homosexuality: A Philosophical Inquiry received positive reviews from James Michael MacLeod in Library Journal, the biologist Douglas J. Futuyma in the Los Angeles Times, and the sociologist Christopher Badcock in the British Journal of Sociology, mixed reviews from the philosopher Timothy F. Murphy in the Journal of Homosexuality and Paul Bloom and the philosopher Edward Stein in The American Scholar, and negative reviews from Jim Sait in Social Alternatives, the cultural historian George Rousseau in the Journal of the History of the Behavioral Sciences, and Ken Plummer in Theory, Culture & Society.

MacLeod credited Ruse with providing a detailed survey of current research in medicine and the behavioral sciences relevant to homosexuality and "a comprehensive analysis of issues relating to homosexuality in both men and women." He concluded that the book was a welcome addition to the literature on homosexuality. Futuyma wrote that Ruse helped to provide the kind of objective discussion of sexual orientation that had previously been lacking. He credited Ruse with carefully discussing various theories of homosexuality, concluding that Ruse rightly took a more skeptical view of evolutionary explanations of homosexuality in the book than he had in his previous writings. He expressed agreement with Ruse's skepticism about hormonal explanations of homosexuality and the psychoanalytic theories, and also with Ruse's view that a person's sexual orientation is not a choice, that homosexuality is not unnatural, and that both neo-Kantian and utilitarian ethical theories must support gay rights. However, he noted that while the book was easy to read and avoided philosophical jargon, it was not always graceful in style, and suggested that gay readers might find some of Ruse's comments about homosexuality insensitive.

Badcock called the book "excellent" and praised its comprehensiveness. Murphy described the book as "an important contribution to the ethics of sexuality", finding its chief virtue to be its moral defense of homosexuality. He supported Ruse's call for gay rights. Nevertheless, he was dissatisfied with the book, finding it limited in scope. He also argued that Ruse attached too much importance to the issue of the origins of homosexuality, and questioned whether causal explanations of the kind discussed by Ruse were convincing. He believed that Ruse ignored problems with Freud's views, and criticized him for failing to discuss the ethics of efforts of scientific attempts to prevent homosexuality. He believed that Ruse over-estimated the importance of AIDS to a theoretical discussion of homosexuality and neglected the effects of public health measures on gay men.

Bloom and Stein considered Ruse's ethical arguments interesting and  his discussion of the various theories of homosexuality clear, intelligent, and innovative. However, they criticized Ruse for failing to acknowledge that it is a mistake to focus only on the origins of homosexuality, and relying upon an implicit understanding of homosexuality. They criticized Ruse for considering only the most extreme form of social constructionism, and found Ruse inconsistent, noting that while he at one stage suggested that there "is no objective criterion for being gay", he often disregarded that view. They found Ruse's discussion of bisexuality unsatisfactory and inaccurate. They also arguing that Ruse failed to recognize the shortcomings of sociobiological theories, including their failure to explain bisexuality. They criticized the amount of space Ruse devoted to discussing psychoanalytic theories, arguing that their lack of empirical support meant that the attention was undeserved. They concluded that the book could not be considered a definitive discussion of its subject.

Stein, in a subsequent book, criticized Ruse for his definition of a "homosexual". He argued that it is vague and does not explain whether someone who only rarely wants to have sex with a person of the same sex is "homosexual", or whether wanting to have sex with a person of the opposite sex would disqualify a person from being "homosexual". He argued that Ruse's definition is wide enough to be a candidate for playing a role in explanation in the sciences and the social sciences, but that its wideness does not prove that sexual orientations are non-arbitrary groups ("natural kinds"). He rejected Ruse's suggestion that defining sexual orientation in terms of sexual feelings rather than sexual behavior shows that social constructionism is false. He observed that while Ruse refers to the work of Boswell to support his case that there were people in periods from that Ancient Greece to that of the Renaissance who were recognized as having a homosexual orientation, such evidence can be interpreted differently. He rejected Ruse's defense of sexual orientation research, arguing that the ethical implications of a research program must be considered in deciding whether the program is worth pursuing.

Sait credited Ruse with outlining the limitations of psychoanalytic, hormonal, and sociobiological theories of homosexuality, but accused Ruse of having "personal biases towards" psychoanalytic and sociobiological theories. He criticized Ruse for relying uncritically on Greek Homosexuality (1978) and other publications by Dover in his discussion of Greek homosexuality. He found Ruse's discussion of the question of whether homosexuality is a sickness or a disease confusing, and suggested that Ruse's attempt at detached philosophical analysis was compromised by Ruse's personal reaction to the AIDS epidemic. He also suggested that Ruse's "explicit and implicit" definitions of homosexuality weakened his discussion of the social aspects of homosexuality. He criticized Ruse for using a "primarily sexual" definition of homosexuality that ignored emotional and other ties between homosexuals, and for writing about homosexuality as though all homosexuals were men, ignoring lesbians and their experience. Nevertheless, he considered Homosexuality: A Philosophical Inquiry useful for combating arguments and theories used to stigmatize homosexuals and applauded Ruse's philosophical support for gay rights.

Rousseau wrote that, like several other recent works about homosexuality, Homosexuality: A Philosophical Inquiry was "more socially rather than scientifically grounded" and that Ruse was not "willing (or equipped) to address the question about etiology." He also wrote that too many of Ruse's positions are "taken with AIDS peering at the reader in the face", and questioned both the extent of Ruse's compassion for homosexuals and the ability of philosophy to help homosexuals. He maintained that Ruse's conclusions "neither advance the theoretical debate about homosexuality nor propose any practical solutions to the homosexual crisis." While granting that the work "abounds with information" and had "noble" objectives, he argued that Ruse had an "impoverished" view of homosexuality that frustrated those objectives, and that Ruse neglected the role love and shame play in the lives of homosexuals. He wrote that while Ruse challenged the idea that homosexuality is a mental illness, he did so "without acknowledging that these views had already been debated in the 1950s". He suggested that Ruse made comments about homosexuality that could be interpreted as expressing the desire to eliminate it, describing this as "outrageous". He agreed with Ruse's conclusion that there should be no discrimination in favor of homosexuals, but nevertheless found Ruse's arguments for that conclusion offensive.

Plummer noted Ruse's sympathy for gay people and rejection of the idea that they are sick. However, he criticized him for taking an "essentialist" view of homosexuality, rejecting social constructionism, neglecting "the more radical arguments of the past two decades", and for his concern with attempting to discover the causes of homosexuality.

The classicist David M. Halperin criticized Ruse for not mentioning the research which in Halperin's view discredited the hypothesis that homosexuality is caused by hormone levels. The economist Richard Posner praised Ruse's care in evaluating rival theories of homosexuality. In 2000, Ruse attributed his interest in homosexuality to having grown up in the United Kingdom at a time when homosexuality was illegal, to his engagements in debate over sociobiology since the 1970s, and to the fact that "no one else seemed to be writing on the subject". He stated he had mixed feelings about the process of writing the book and that it had been superseded by Murphy's Gay Science (1997).

See also
 Biology and sexual orientation
 Environment and sexual orientation
 One Hundred Years of Homosexuality
 The Mismeasure of Desire

References

Bibliography
Books

 
 
 
 
 

Journals

  
  
  
 
 
  
  
  

Online articles

 

1988 non-fiction books
American non-fiction books
Books about psychoanalysis
Books about social constructionism
Books about sociobiology
Books about the philosophy of sexuality
Books by Michael Ruse
Contemporary philosophical literature
English-language books
Sexual ethics books